Béla Zoltán (31 January 1865 – 30 October 1929) was a Hungarian politician and jurist, who served as Minister of Justice in 1919. He was a member of the House of Magnates from 1927.

References
 Magyar Életrajzi Lexikon

1865 births
1929 deaths
Justice ministers of Hungary